Bang Bon Tai is a khwaeng (subdistrict) of Bang Bon District, in Bangkok, Thailand. In 2020, it had a total population of 24,860 people.

Transportation

Rail
Bang Bon Tai is connected with Maha Chai (downtown Samut Sakhon) by the Maeklong Railway of the State Railway of Thailand (SRT). Bang Bon, Kan Kheha, Rang Sakae (defunct), Rang Pho, Sam Yaek and Phromdaen are the stations of the area. They were all located on the border with their neighbouring Samae Dam of Bang Khun Thian District.

Road
Bang Bon Tai is connected to Maha Chai by Ekkachai Road (Highway 3242). Kanchanaphisek Road (Outer Ring Road) also passes the area.

References

Subdistricts of Bangkok
Bang Bon district